Tripterotyphis is a genus of sea snails, marine gastropod mollusks in the family Muricidae, the murex snails or rock snails.

Species
Species within the genus Tripterotyphis include:

 Tripterotyphis arcana (DuShane, 1969)
 Tripterotyphis colemani (Ponder, 1972)
 Tripterotyphis fayae (Keen & Campbell, 1964)
 Tripterotyphis galapagosensis Wiedrick & Houart, 2021
 Tripterotyphis jamesmacleani Wiedrick & Houart, 2021
 Tripterotyphis lowei (Pilsbry, 1931)
 Tripterotyphis norfolkensis (C. A. Fleming, 1962)
 Tripterotyphis robustus (Verco, 1895)
 Tripterotyphis tenuis Garrigues, 2020
 Tripterotyphis triangularis (A. Adams, 1856)
 † Tripterotyphis tripterus (Grateloup, 1833)

References

 Fleming, C.A. (1962). The genus Pterynotus Swainson (Gastropoda, family Muricidae) in New Zealand, and Norfolk Island. Transactions of the Royal Society of New Zealand (Zoology) 2: 109–119.

External links
 Pilsbry, H. A. & Lowe, H. N. (1932). West Mexican and Central American mollusks collected by H. N. Lowe, 1929–1931. Proceedings of the Academy of Natural Sciences of Philadelphia. 84: 33-144, 17 pls